Cangonj Pass is a mountain pass located in the village of Cangonj, Korçë County, southeastern Albania. It is located between Mount Moravë and Mount Ivan south of Lake Prespa, and connects the Korçë Plain in the west with the Poloskë-Bilisht plain in the east. Crossed by the Devoll, the mountain pass was formed through the millennia by the excavating process of the flow of this river.

In classical antiquity the name of the mountain pass was recorded as Tsangon, which was traditionally a border area between Macedon and Illyria, being part of an important east-west communication route.

History 

The Tsangon Pass is mentioned by Arrian (2nd century CE) in The Anabasis of Alexander when describing Alexander's campaign in Illyria and the Siege of Pelium, which was waged in 335 BCE by Alexander the Great against Illyrians who revolted under the leadership of Cleitus, son of Bardylis, with the aid of Glaukias king of the Taulantii. This mountain pass controlled one of the only two main west-east routes between Illyria and Macedonia. The other one was the route that became Via Egnatia in Roman times, which was located further north. Alexander undertake his campaign in the Tsangon Pass to take Pelion ensuring the control of his western border, in order to protect Macedonia from Illyrian invasion before setting out for his eastern campaign. The northern route was already controlled by Macedon after Philip II's founding of Herakleia.

The Tsangon Pass was likely used by Roman consul Sulpicius Galba to reach Macedonia from Illyria during the 199 BC military operations he undertook in the Second Macedonian War. Tsangon was a mountain pass that linked the region of Lynkestis to southern Illyria.

In World War II the pass was controlled by the advancing Greek forces at the initial stage of the Greco-Italian War (1940-1941).

References

Bibliography 

Mountain passes of Albania
Geography of Korçë County
Illyrian Albania